The Montmorency cherry is a variety of sour cherry (Prunus cerasus) grown in Europe, Canada, and the United States, particularly in the Grand Traverse Bay region of Northwest Michigan and in Door County, Wisconsin. Montmorency cherries are part of the lighter-red Amarelle cultivar of sour cherries, rather than the darker-red Morello cultivar. Michigan produces over 90,000 tons of Montmorency cherries each year.

History
The tree is named for Montmorency, a suburb of Paris, France.

The tree produces large, light red fruit (although some trees produce a darker red fruit) and has been cultivated in the United States since at least the early 20th century. It is the most popular sour cherry in the United States and Canada, and is extensively used in cherry pies, as well as in jams and preserves.

Montmorency cherries are also marketed in dried form, and Montmorency cherry juice and juice concentrate are also sold.

See also
Cherry production in Michigan
Michigan wine

References 

Cherry cultivars
Sour cherries
Sour fruits